The London, Brighton and South Coast Railway (LB&SCR) C class was a type of 0-6-0 freight steam locomotive designed by William Stroudley.

Background
Four 0-6-0 locomotives were on order from Brighton railway works at the time that William Stroudley took over from John Chester Craven as Locomotive Superintendent in 1870. He cancelled this order and replaced it with another for two locomotives of his own design, Nos. 83 and 84 which appeared in December 1871. Eighteen further locomotives were constructed between March 1873 and November 1874, Nos. 77-82 by Brighton works and the remainder by Messrs. Kitson and Company

Use
The class were powerful locomotives for their time and the design was "an archetype for heavy goods engines in Scotland as well as Southern England," but in other respects were Stroudley's least successful design, suffering from poor steaming. Within a decade of their introduction the class was being replaced by his C1 class 0-6-0 design of 1882–87 on the heaviest trains. Nevertheless, they proved to be reliable locomotives and survived for nearly thirty years on secondary freight duties. Members of the class were withdrawn between 1901 and 1904.

Locomotive summary

References

Sources
 
 

C
0-6-0 locomotives
Railway locomotives introduced in 1871
Scrapped locomotives
Standard gauge steam locomotives of Great Britain
Freight locomotives